Pradhan (Devanagari: प्रधान) is generally ministerial title of Sanskrit origin in cultures of Hindu tradition, mainly used in the Indian subcontinent. The Sanskrit pradhāna translates to "major" or "prime"; however, the more modern Hindi definitions provided by the Oxford Hindi-English Dictionary also include "chief" and "leader". The precise interpretation can differ significantly by region. The style was abandoned by many Indian princely states during the Mughal era in favor of Persian styles such as Wasir and Diwan.

Local head
Pradhan is elected by the village-level constitutional body of local self-government called the Panchayat (village/gram government) in India. The Pradhan, together with other elected members, have the power of constituencies of the gram panchayat. The pradhan is the focal point of contact between government officers and the village community. The Pradhan title in such setting is mainly used in east Indian states of West Bengal, Bihar, Jharkhand and Odisha. Similarly, in the Deoghar district of Jharkhand, Pradhan is the head of the village who inherits this hereditary office. In some villages, they are also known as Mulraiyat.

Title and surname

In India, Pradhan is a title used as a surname most notably by the Chandraseniya Kayastha Prabhu of Maharashtra, the Chasa, Khandayat, Gopal of Odisha, among others.

In modern Nepal, Pradhan is employed as a high-caste lineage surname by a section of the Kshatriya (क्षत्रिय) (locally pronounced Chatharīya) caste of Newārs who trace their roots to north-Indian dynasties like the Karnat and Raghuvanshi Rajputs before being absorbed among the Srēṣṭha in the 14th CE. Among the Newars, the two traditional lineages among Kathmandu and Patan's Pradhans are the Thamel and Patan Pradhans respectively. They are included in the highest tier "Thakur" (ठाकूर/ठकू/ठकुरी) lineage of the Chatharīya (छथरीय) Srēṣṭha caste who are the descendants of Malla (Nepal) royalty and its nobility. The fallout of the Unification of Nepal also prompted many of Bhaktapur's Malla descendants to change their titles as Pradhan or Pradhānānga, who have since spread all over Nepal. Other family names of Chatharīya consist of lineages Malla, Joshi, Rājbhandārī, Rājvanshī, Raghuvanshi, Hādā, Amātya, Karmāchārya, among others, who intermarry with each other. Chatharīyas are distinguished by the use of their clan titles (e.g., Pradhān, Malla, Rājbhandārī) instead of the all-encompassing "Shrestha" surname. Newar caste system stratifies them under Kshatriya varna, and the pan-Nepal 1854 Muluki Ain stratification placed the Chatharīya Newars among the twice-born, sacred-thread wearing Tagadhari group. Owing to their heterogenous roots, Chathariya Pradhans are generally divided among three gotras- Kashyapa, Mandavya, Manav. 

In the Indian states of Sikkim and sections of West Bengal, Assam and Bhutan, Pradhan is a title assumed by all the Newar descendants who had immigrated from Kathmandu Valley to these places primarily since the mid 18th century. Descendants of the various immigrant upper and lower Newar castes all adopted the singular title of 'Pradhān' as their singular caste-denoting name, whereas Pradhan in Nepal is only used by descendants of the noble Chatharīya lineages of Kathmandu and Patan. The Pradhans of Sikkim form an influential ethnic group of a homogenous, non-caste and non-endogamous Newar community, which is in sharp contrast to that of the Newars of Nepal which still retains its highly complex, heterogenous and caste-based society. Due to this reason of hypergamous and doubtful origins of their lineage status, the Pradhans of Nepal view the caste-status of these Pradhans from Sikkim and Darjeeling with doubt and avoid matrimonial ties with them. Notable Pradhans of Sikkim include trader Chandravir Pradhan (Kayastha), literary icon Paras Mani Pradhan (Shakya), first Chief Justice of Nepal Hari Prasad Pradhan, Bollywood cinematographer Binod Pradhan, footballer Sanju Pradhan, 1974 AD lead singer Adrian Pradhan, actors Menuka Pradhan, Poojana Pradhan, Uttam Pradhan, etc. In terms of India's Affirmative action policy, they are a Forward caste/General in all of India except in Sikkim where, like the entirety of its native Nepali-origin population, Pradhans/Newars are given protective status; Newars, along with Bahun and Chhetri of Sikkim, have been categorised as Other Backward Class, while the rest of Nepali-speaking Sikkim populace are categorised under Scheduled Castes and Scheduled Tribes.

Usages
 Pradhan:  was the title of a Minister who sat on the Council of 8 (Ashta Pradhan) in the early Maratha Empire prior to Peshwa (designation as Pantpradhan)  administration.

Sources

Titles in India
Executive ministers
Heads of government
Newar